Subcarpathian Voivodeship or Subcarpathia Province (in  ) is a voivodeship, or province, in the southeastern corner of Poland. Its administrative capital and largest city is Rzeszów. Along with the Marshall, it is governed by the Subcarpathian Regional Assembly. Historically, most of the province's territory was part of the Kingdom of Galicia–Volhynia, the Kingdom of Galicia and Lodomeria and the Ruthenian Voivodeship. In the interwar period, it was part of the Lwów Voivodeship.

The voivodeship was created on 1 January 1999 out of the former Rzeszów, Przemyśl, Krosno and (partially) Tarnów and Tarnobrzeg Voivodeships, pursuant to the Polish local-government reforms adopted in 1998. The name derives from the region's location near the Carpathian Mountains, and the voivodeship comprises areas of two historic regions of Eastern Europe — Lesser Poland (western and northwestern counties) and Red Ruthenia. During the interwar period (1918-1939), Subcarpathian Voivodeship belonged to "Poland B", the less-developed, more rural parts of Poland. To boost the local economy, the government of the Second Polish Republic began in the mid-1930s a massive program of industrialization, known as the Central Industrial Region. The program created several major armament factories, including PZL Mielec, PZL Rzeszów, Huta Stalowa Wola, and factories in other Subcarpathian towns such as Dębica, Nowa Dęba, Sanok, Tarnobrzeg and Nowa Sarzyna. One of the names that was proposed for this voivodeship, was Galician, referring to the old historical region of Galicia. Despite having the approval of the population, the name that was put at the end was Subcarpathian, although it has never been called this way before.

It is bordered by Lesser Poland Voivodeship to the west, Świętokrzyskie Voivodeship to the north-west, Lublin Voivodeship to the north, Ukraine (Lviv Oblast and Zakarpattia Oblast) to the east and Slovakia (Prešov Region) to the south. The voivodeship is mostly hilly or mountainous (see Bieszczady, Beskidy); its northwestern corner is flat. It is one of the most wooded Polish voivodeships (35.9% of total area), within its borders there is whole Bieszczady National Park, and parts of Magura National Park.

Cities and towns
The voivodeship contains 6 cities and 45 towns. These are listed below in descending order of population (according to official figures as of 2019)

Administrative division
Subcarpathian Voivodeship is divided into 25 counties (powiats): 4 city counties and 21 land counties. These are further divided into 160 gminas.

The counties are listed in the following table (ordering within categories is by decreasing population).

Protected areas

Protected areas in Subcarpathian Voivodeship include two national parks and 11 Landscape Parks. These are listed below.
 Bieszczady National Park (part of the East Carpathian Biosphere Reserve)
 Magura National Park (partly in Lesser Poland Voivodeship)
 Cisna-Wetlina Landscape Park
 Czarnorzeki-Strzyżów Landscape Park
 Jaśliska Landscape Park
 Janów Forests Landscape Park (partly in Lublin Voivodeship)
 Pasmo Brzanki Landscape Park (partly in Lesser Poland Voivodeship)
 Pogórze Przemyskie Landscape Park
 Puszcza Solska Landscape Park (partly in Lublin Voivodeship)
 San Valley Landscape Park
 Słonne Mountains Landscape Park
 South Roztocze Landscape Park (partly in Lublin Voivodeship)

Economy 
The Gross domestic product (GDP) of the province was 19.4 billion euros in 2018, accounting for 3.9% of Polish economic output. GDP per capita adjusted for purchasing power was 15,100 euros or 50% of the EU27 average in the same year. The GDP per employee was 59% of the EU average. Podkarpackie Voivodship is the province with the third lowest GDP per capita in Poland.

History

Ethnic groups
Population according to 2002 census

 Poles - 2 079 208(98,8 %)
 Pogorzans
 Ukrainians - 3271 (0,2 %)
 Rusyns
 Lemkos - 147
 Boykos
 Romani people - 717
 Americans - 129
 Russians - 128
 Germans - 116
 Italians - 108
 No answer - 19 055(0,9 %)

Most popular surnames in the region
 Mazur: 9,530
 Nowak: 9,301
 Baran: 8,020

Notable residents
 Moe Drabowsky, American major league baseball pitcher
 Stefan Turchak, Ukrainian conductor

Subcarpathia landscape pictures

See also
 Second Polish Republic's Lwów Voivodeship
 Galicia

References

Notes

External links

 Subcarpathia photo gallery
  Subcarpathian Voivodeship official website
  Podkarpacki Urząd Wojewódzki Official website
  The castles and palaces of Subcarpathian province

 
1999 establishments in Poland
States and territories established in 1999
Rusyn communities